Southeast Missouri State University (Southeast or SEMO) is a public university in Cape Girardeau, Missouri. In addition to the main campus, the university has four regional campuses offering full degree programs and a secondary campus housing the Holland College of Arts and Media. The university is accredited by the Higher Learning Commission.

Enrolling nearly 12,000 students, Southeast offers more than 175 undergraduate degree programs and 75 graduate programs. Originally founded in 1873 as a normal school, the university has a traditional strength in teacher education. In recent years, the university's reputation and focus has shifted towards the arts, with the construction of the River Campus creating the state's only campus entirely dedicated to the visual and performing arts. It is the only four year institution of higher education in the Southeast Missouri area.

Five academic units make up the university: the Holland College of Arts and Media; the Harrison College of Business and Computing; the College of Education, Health, and Human Studies; College of Humanities and Social Sciences; and the College of Science, Technology, Engineering, and Mathematics. The university's thirteen athletics teams compete in the Ohio Valley Conference of NCAA Division I and are known as the Southeast Missouri State Redhawks. The football team participates as part of the Football Championship Subdivision of Division I.

History
Southeast Missouri State University was founded in 1873 when a group of locally prominent businessmen and politicians successfully lobbied the State of Missouri to designate Cape Girardeau as the home of the Third District Normal School. Originally known as Southeast Missouri State Normal School, the first classes were taught at the nearby Lorimier School until April 1875, when the first university building was completed.

The university has had five names in its history:
Southeast Missouri State Normal School, 1873–1881
Missouri State Normal School—Third District, 1881–1919
Southeast Missouri State Teachers College, 1919–1946
Southeast Missouri State College, 1946–1973
Southeast Missouri State University, 1973–present

The Normal building was described by Mark Twain in Life on the Mississippi (1883): "There was another college higher up on an airy summit—a bright new edifice, picturesquely and peculiarly towered and pinnacled—a sort of gigantic casters, with the cruets all complete."
The original Normal School building burned down on April 8, 1902, and was replaced in 1906 by Academic Hall, the school's domed landmark building. Academic Hall was designed by Jerome Bibb Legg, who also designed the St. Louis Exposition and Music Hall, and it includes light fixtures from the 1904 World's Fair. Academic Hall today stands at the center of campus and is home to the university's administrative offices as well as several classrooms and an auditorium.

In the 1950s, Southeast Missouri State College had an enrollment of approximately 1,600 students. Enrollment steadily increased to more than 7,000 students in the 1970s due to low tuition costs, aggressive recruiting, and the construction of Interstate 55 between St. Louis and Cape Girardeau. The college also moved away from its focus on training teachers and began to offer courses of study in business, nursing, and the liberal arts. Due to the expansion of curriculum and student body population, the college became Southeast Missouri State University in 1972. The size of the campus also grew rapidly in this same period. In 1956, the institution had ten buildings on campus. By 1975, the number had increased to twenty-two buildings.

In 1998, the university acquired the former St. Vincent's Seminary located in downtown Cape Girardeau on the Mississippi River. This property has been redeveloped as the River Campus, which opened in Fall 2007 and houses the Earl and Margie Holland School of Visual and Performing Arts. The construction of the River Campus began to shift the institution's focus towards the visual and performing arts, which today forms the basis of the university's statewide reputation.

Missouri State Normal School Third District President John Sephus McGhee established the University Schools on June 15, 1896. This allowed prospective teachers to gain real-world teaching experience while earning their degrees. As the university expanded its curriculum and extra-curricular activities, so did the University Schools. In 1903, as recent construction allowed for more space for university classes, the training school was able to expand its class sizes as well. The University Schools consisted of an elementary, junior high, and high school. The University Schools closed at the end of the 1986–1987 school year due to increasing costs.

University presidents 

  Lucius H. Cheney (1873–76)
  Alfred Kirk (1876–77)
  Charles Henry Dutcher (1877–81)
  Richard Chapman Norton (1881–93)
  Willard Duncan Vandiver (1893–97)
  John Sephus McGhee (1897–99)
  Washington Strother Dearmont (1899–1921)
  Joseph Archibald Serena (1921–33)
  Walter Winfield Parker (1933–56)
  Mark F. Scully (1956–75)
  Robert E. Leestamper (1975–79)
  Bill W. Stacy (1979–89)
  Robert W. Foster (1989–90)
  Kala Stroup (1990–95)
  Bill Atchley (1995–96)
  Dale F. Nitzschke (1996–99)
  Kenneth W. Dobbins (1999–2015)
  Carlos Vargas-Aburto (2015–present)

Campus

River Campus 
The River Campus is home to the Earl and Margie Holland School of Visual and Performing Arts. The facilities incorporate two buildings: the Seminary Building and the Cultural Arts Center. These buildings contain the Donald C. Bedell Performance Hall, the Rosemary Berkel and Harry L. Crisp II Museum, the John and Betty Glenn Convocation Center, the Wendy Kurka Rust Flexible Theatre, the Robert F. and Gertrude L. Shuck Music Recital Hall, and the River Campus Art Gallery. It is home to the departments of Art, Music, Theater and Dance. The River Campus hosts many performance series: the Touring Series, the Theater and Dance Series, the Symphony Series, the Southeast Ensemble Series, the Jazz Series, the Faculty Recital Series and Sundays at Three chamber music Series. The Rosemary Berkel and Harry L. Crisp II Museum and Art Gallery features rotating touring exhibitions.

Regional campuses 
Southeast and Three Rivers Community College in Poplar Bluff, MO agreed in 2004 to share higher education facilities at three locations in southeast Missouri: Sikeston, Kennett, and Malden.  In spring 2005, Southeast eliminated Three Rivers courses from those centers, citing failure of the community college to pay approximately $10,000 in facilities-use fees.  Southeast took over all course offerings at the centers, which have subsequently been named regional campuses of Southeast Missouri State University. Three Rivers Community College filed a lawsuit in March 2005 against Southeast. The lawsuit was subsequently dropped, and Southeast and Three Rivers recently announced plans to develop a joint bachelor's degree program in social work. Southeast now operates four regional campuses, at Kennett, Malden, Sikeston, and Perryville.

List of residence halls 

Cheney
Dearmont
Henderson Hall
Myers
Vandiver Hall
Merick Hall
Towers East
Towers North
Towers South
Towers West
Greek Housing
LaFerla Hall
Dobbins Hall

Athletics

Southeast Missouri State has been a member of NCAA Division I (Division I FCS for football) since moving up from Division II in 1991. As a result of the promotion in classifications, Southeast Missouri State left the Division II athletic conference Mid–America Intercollegiate Athletics Association (MIAA) (which they've been a charter member back in 1912) and joined the Division I Ohio Valley Conference (OVC).

List of fraternities and sororities
Among the fraternities and sororities affiliated with the school are:

North American Interfraternity Conference

Delta Chi
Phi Delta Theta
Pi Kappa Alpha
Sigma Chi
Sigma Nu
Sigma Phi Epsilon
Theta Xi
Tau Kappa Epsilon

National Panhellenic Conference

Alpha Chi Omega
Alpha Delta Pi
Alpha Xi Delta
Delta Delta Delta
Gamma Phi Beta
Sigma Sigma Sigma
Alpha Phi

National Pan-Hellenic Council Fraternities and Sororities

Alpha Phi Alpha fraternity
Delta Sigma Theta sorority
Sigma Gamma Rho sorority
Zeta Phi Beta sorority
Phi Beta Sigma fraternity
Iota Phi Theta fraternity

Independent Social Fraternities
Lambda Chi Alpha
Tau Kappa Epsilon
Phi Mu Alpha

Professional and Service Fraternities

Gamma Sigma Sigma
Alpha Chi Sigma
Sigma Alpha Iota
Alpha Kappa Psi
Alpha Phi Omega

Arrow student newspaper
The Arrow is the university's student newspaper. The second editor of the Capaha Arrow was Rush Limbaugh Sr. who became a nationally recognized Missouri attorney and practiced law in Cape Girardeau until just before his passing at the age of 104 in 1996; he was the grandfather of the media personality Rush Limbaugh. After the university changed its mascot from Indians/Otahkians to Redhawks, the newspaper dropped Capaha and is now known as simply The Arrow. It is still run by students in the Department of Mass Media and publishes a biweekly newspaper distributed throughout campus. Microfilm and print copies of the Capaha Arrow dating back to the first issue are available at Kent Library and Special Collections and Archives, and some stories are also put on The Arrow website.

Notable alumni
 1941 Velmer A. Fassel, scientist, Ames Laboratory and Iowa State University
 1955 Kenneth Dement, football player, lawyer, and local community leader
 1960 Dick Hantak, NFL referee
 1960 Ken Iman, center with NFL's Green Bay Packers and Los Angeles Rams
 1961 Roy Thomas, comic book writer and former Editor-in-Chief of Marvel Comics
 1968 Clyde A. Vaughn, United States Army Lieutenant General and Director of the Army National Guard
 1969 James T. Conway, Commandant of the United States Marine Corps
 1974 Linda Godwin, NASA astronaut
 1976 Peter Kinder, politician
 1979 Steve Tappmeyer, basketball coach
 1980 Desi Barmore (born 1960), American-Israeli basketball player
 1987 Cedric Kyles, aka Cedric the Entertainer
 1994 Steven Tilley, Speaker of the Missouri House of Representatives
 1994 Kerry Robinson, Former Major League outfielder for the St. Louis Cardinals
 1998 Angel Rubio, football player
 2000 Jason Witczak, kicker with the AFL's Nashville Kats
 2001 Neal E. Boyd, 2008 winner of America's Got Talent
 2003 Willie Ponder, wide receiver with NFL's St. Louis Rams
 2004 Eugene Amano, center with the NFL's Tennessee Titans
 2005 Dan Connolly, center/offensive guard with the NFL's New England Patriots
 2006 Edgar Jones, outside linebacker with NFL's Baltimore Ravens
 2007 Joe Tuineau, lock with Southland Rugby in the Air New Zealand Cup
 2017 Antonius Cleveland, guard with the NBA’s Dallas Mavericks

References

External links

 
 Southeast Missouri State University Athletics

 
Educational institutions established in 1873
Buildings and structures in Cape Girardeau, Missouri
Public universities and colleges in Missouri
Education in Cape Girardeau County, Missouri
Education in Scott County, Missouri
Education in Dunklin County, Missouri
Education in Perry County, Missouri
Education in Butler County, Missouri
Tourist attractions in Cape Girardeau County, Missouri
1873 establishments in Missouri